Francis Vane Hughes (26 February 1894 – 23 January 1978), nicknamed Checker, was an Australian rules footballer and coach in the Victorian Football League (now the Australian Football League). He coached the Melbourne Football Club to premiership success, and was responsible for the club changing its nickname to the Demons.

Playing career 
A small and quick player with brilliant skills in stab passing and handball, Hughes played in two Richmond Football Club premiership sides.
 Richmond 1914–15; 1919–23 (87 games, 51 goals)
 Premierships 1920, 1921.

Coaching career 

Hughes coached over an extended period with a great deal of success, securing 5 VFL premierships.  When his friend and former Richmond Secretary Percy Page went to Melbourne Football Club, Hughes followed him. He renamed the "Fuchsias" to Demons, sacked 13 players, and instilled discipline in the club.
 Ulverstone (Tasmania) 1924–1926
 Richmond 1927–1932 (120 games, 87 wins, 31 losses, 2 draws)
 Melbourne 1933–1941, 1945–1948, 1965 (254 games, 157 wins, 95 losses, 2 draws)
 5 Premierships: 1932 (Richmond); 1939, 1940, 1941, 1948 (Melbourne).

Hughes was inducted to the Australian Football Hall of Fame in 1996 with his citation reading:
Took Richmond to premiership success in 1932 then went to Melbourne and landed another four flags. A tough and disciplined coach.

References 

 Hogan P: The Tigers Of Old, Richmond FC, Melbourne 1996

External links

 
 Australian Football Hall of Fame
Richmond Football Club - Hall of Fame

Australian Football Hall of Fame inductees
Richmond Football Club players
Richmond Football Club Premiership players
Richmond Football Club coaches
Richmond Football Club Premiership coaches
Melbourne Football Club coaches
1894 births
1978 deaths
Australian rules footballers from Victoria (Australia)
Melbourne Football Club Premiership coaches
Two-time VFL/AFL Premiership players
Sport Australia Hall of Fame inductees
Five-time VFL/AFL Premiership coaches